Copromyza stercoraria is a species of fly in the family Sphaeroceridae. It is found in the  Palearctic .

References

External links
Ecology of Commanster

Sphaeroceridae
Insects described in 1830
Muscomorph flies of Europe